Lord Forbes is the senior Lordship of Parliament in the Peerage of Scotland.

The title was created sometime after 1436 for Alexander de Forbes, feudal baron of Forbes. The precise date of the creation is not known, but in a Precept dated July 12, 1442, he is already styled Lord Forbes. Brown's 1834 Peerage of Scotland gives a creation year of 1440. Alexander's descendant, the twelfth Lord, served as Lord Lieutenant of Aberdeenshire and Kincardineshire. His great-grandson, the seventeenth Lord, was a general in the Army and sat in the House of Lords as a Scottish Representative Peer from 1806 to 1843. His son, the eighteenth Lord, fought at the Battle of Waterloo in 1815.

He was succeeded by his son, the nineteenth Lord. He was a Scottish Representative Peer from 1874 to 1906. His nephew, the twenty-first Lord, served as a Scottish Representative Peer between 1917 and 1924. The latter's son, the twenty-second Lord, sat in the House of Lords as a Scottish Representative Peer from 1955 to 1963, when all Scottish peers were given an automatic seat in the House of Lords, and served in the Conservative administration of Harold Macmillan as Minister of State for Scotland from 1958 to 1959.  The title is currently held by his son, Malcolm Nigel, the twenty-third Lord Forbes, who succeeded in 2013. Lord Forbes is Chief of Clan Forbes.

Hon. Patrick Forbes, third son of the second Lord Forbes, was the ancestor of both the Earls of Granard and the Forbes baronets of Craigievar. Also, the Lords Forbes of Pitsligo were descended from Sir William Forbes, brother of Alexander Forbes, 1st Lord Forbes.

The family seat is Castle Forbes near Alford, Aberdeenshire.

Lords Forbes (c. 1444)

 Alexander Forbes, 1st Lord Forbes (1380–1448)
 James Forbes, 2nd Lord Forbes (d. 1462)
 William Forbes, 3rd Lord Forbes (d. 1483)
 Alexander Forbes, 4th Lord Forbes (d. 1491)
 Arthur Forbes, 5th Lord Forbes (d. 1493)
 John Forbes, 6th Lord Forbes (1475–1547)
 William Forbes, 7th Lord Forbes (1513-1593)
 John Forbes, 8th Lord Forbes (1542–1606)
 John Forbes, 9th Lord Forbes (1561–1606)
 Arthur Forbes, 10th Lord Forbes (1581–1641)
 Alexander Forbes, 11th Lord Forbes (1600-1672)
 William Forbes, 12th Lord Forbes (1620-1697)
 William Forbes, 13th Lord Forbes (1656–1716)
 William Forbes, 14th Lord Forbes (1680-1730)
 Francis Forbes, 15th Lord Forbes (1721–1734)
 James Forbes, 16th Lord Forbes (1687-1761) (1687–1761)
 James Forbes, 17th Lord Forbes (1761-1804) (1761–1804)
 James Forbes, 18th Lord Forbes (1765–1843)
 Walter Forbes, 19th Lord Forbes (1798–1868)
 Horace Forbes, 19th Lord Forbes (1829–1914)
 Atholl Monson Forbes, 20th Lord Forbes (1841–1916)
 Atholl Forbes, 21st Lord Forbes (1882–1953)
 Nigel Forbes, 22nd Lord Forbes (1918–2013)
 Malcolm Forbes, 23rd Lord Forbes (b. 1946)

The heir apparent is the present holder's grandson, Geordie Forbes, Master of Forbes (b. 2010).

Ancestry

See also

Clan Forbes
Earl of Granard
Lord Forbes of Pitsligo
Forbes baronets

References

Sources

Forbes
 
Forbes